Robert Donald Teare, FRCP, FRCPath (1 July 1911 – 17 January 1979) was a senior British pathologist.

Early life
Teare was born 1 July 1911 on the Isle of Man, and educated at King William's College, and Gonville and Caius College, Cambridge. He trained at St George's Hospital, London, from where he qualified in 1936. He married Kathleen Agnes Gracey in 1937.

Career
Teare began his career as a lecturer in forensic medicine at St Bartholomew's Hospital Medical College. In 1963 he became reader at St George's Hospital, where he established a department of Forensic Medicine, and eventually professor of forensic medicine at Charing Cross Hospital Medical School, a post he held until retirement in 1975. Teare was also a lecturer at the Metropolitan Police College, Hendon, and served as President of the Medical Defence Union. He was a Fellow of the Royal College of Physicians and of the Royal College of Pathologists, and served as President of the British Association in Forensic Medicine in 1962.

Teare published the first modern description of hypertrophic cardiomyopathy in 1958. Today this disease is considered the leading cause of sudden cardiac death in young athletes.

In 1973, Teare carried out the autopsy on Bruce Lee, as well as Jimi Hendrix's in 1970. Teare supervised the autopsy of Brian Epstein in 1967.

Together with Keith Simpson and Francis Camps, Teare was one of the "Three Musketeers", who dealt with almost all the suspicious deaths in the London area. He was called to give evidence in many high-profile criminal investigations, such as the murder of Beryl Evans and her baby Geraldine in the Timothy Evans case. Teare's accident investigations included the Harrow and Wealdstone rail crash, which killed 112 people in 1952.

Teare retired in 1975 and died 17 January 1979 on the Isle of Man, at the age of 67.

References

Sources
 Obituary, The Times, 19 November 1979, p. 30
 Mitchel P. Roth, "Historical dictionary of law enforcement", Greenwood Publishing Group, 2001, p. 344
 Obituary, British Medical Journal, 3 February 1979, p. 354

1911 births
1979 deaths
British pathologists
Manx people
Alumni of Gonville and Caius College, Cambridge
Fellows of the Royal College of Physicians
People educated at King William's College
20th-century British medical doctors